Richie Grant (born February 28, 1970) is the head men's soccer coach at the California State University, Bakersfield. He has held that position since 2014, and has posted a 102–83–16 record in ten seasons. He is a two-time Conference USA Coach of the Year winner, and led the 2004 squad to the NCAA tournament, their first appearance since 1993. The 2004 team also won the Conference USA title. His teams have been ranked in the top 25 four out of the past five years, including a school record national ranking of 10.

He previously served as the head men's soccer coach at Lambuth University in Jackson, Tennessee. He led that program to a 53–29–2 record over 4 seasons including back-to-back Mid-South conference titles. He is a 1993 graduate of Green Mountain College in Poultney, Vermont where he was a three-time NAIA all-American defender. He later played for the Minnesota Thunder.

References

External links
http://www.gotigersgo.com/sports/m-soccer/mtt/grant_richie00.html

Memphis Tigers men's soccer coaches
Minnesota Thunder players
Green Mountain College alumni
Lambuth University people
Living people
1970 births
Cal State Bakersfield Roadrunners men's soccer coaches
Association football defenders
American soccer players
American soccer coaches